Serge Babary (born 16 July 1946) is a French politician. He is a member of the French Senate representing Indre-et-Loire. He was also mayor of Tours between 2014 and 2017.

References

1946 births
Living people
French Senators of the Fifth Republic
Politicians from Tours, France
The Republicans (France) politicians
Mayors of places in Centre-Val de Loire
Senators of Indre-et-Loire